Scottish Jamaicans are Jamaicans of Scottish descent. Scottish Jamaicans include those of European and mixed African and Asian ancestry with Scottish ancestors and date back to the earliest period of post-Spanish, European colonisation.

An early influx of Scots came in 1656, when 1200 prisoners of war were deported by Oliver Cromwell. There was also a later migration at the turn of the 18th century, after the failed Darien colony in Panama. In 1707, when the Act of Union took place, Scots gained access to England's preexisting colonies.

People of Scottish Jamaican descent
 Akala, British rapper and poet
 Harry Belafonte
 William Davidson, radical
Paul Douglas (Grammy Award-winning drummer and bandleader of Toots and The Maytals)
 Ms. Dynamite, British singer and rapper
 Stewart Faulkner, British retired athlete of Jamaican and Cuban parentage
Salena Godden, poet and author of Jamaican Irish parentage, descendant of Scottish ancestor Lieutenant General James Robinson (1762–1845) who is buried at Edinburgh University.
 Goldie, British disc jockey of Scottish and Jamaican parentage
 Harry J, record producer
 Lewis Hutchinson, Scottish immigrant to Jamaica; owned a castle; one of the world's first known serial killers
 Colin Powell, American general, of Scottish Jamaican parentage
 Mary Seacole, father was a Scottish soldier
 Gil Scott-Heron, late American soul and jazz poet
 Robert Wedderburn
  Gilbert St. Elmo Heron (aka "Gillie Heron – The Black Arrow". Jamaican of Scottish/African Ancestry.  First Jamaican professional footballer in Scottish Celtic Football Club (Scotland); and Detroit Wolverine Football Club (US). Father of Gil Scott-Heron, late American soul and jazz poet. "Gillie" Heron is the descendant of Jamaican-born Captain Alexander Woodburn Heron (1815–1901) of  Wigton, Williamsfield (and 30 other plantations in Manchester, Jamaica), and the Barbican Estate in St. Andrew, Jamaica,  and Scottish-born British Army Major Alexander Heron (1761–1825) of Scotland and Wigton, Manchester, Jamaica.

See also
 Scottish place names in Jamaica
 Scottish colonization of the Americas
 Tobacco Lords
White Jamaicans

References

Further reading
 Besson, Jean Martha Brae's two histories: European expansion and Caribbean culture-building in Jamaica (The Scottish and Creole planters around Martha Brae - Google books version)
 Karras, Alan L. Sojourners in the Sun: Scottish Migrants in Jamaica and the Chesapeake, 1740-1800 (Google books version)

External links
 The Forgotten Diaspora
 Scots ashamed of role in Jamaican Slavery

Ethnic groups in Jamaica
European Jamaican
European diaspora in North America
Scottish Caribbean
Jamaica